Footdown is a group bicycle game where the objective is to avoid put your foot on the ground.  Participants cycle around until there is only one person who has not put his or her foot down on the floor, whether it be the full foot, or just a toe. Rules vary, sometimes physical contact is allowed (Touching hands, feet or ramming with the bike are considered contact) others allow no physical contact.

The playing area is usually flat area such as basketball courts, tennis courts or driveways, once a player has set a foot down on the ground and is eliminated they may use their bike as a border, all the eliminated players will create the circular border making the area smaller and smaller as the final participants battle to the end. Some players may choose to not use their bikes as a boarder and simply get out of the arena.

It is quite legitimate to steer a competitor into the curb so they have no choice but to put their foot down.  Note that this game favors those with a good sense of balance. Footdown may be played on any type of bike. A variant of footdown called 'derby' is played by the SCUL bicycle chopper gang.

On November 3, 2007, Circuit BMX shop, located in Pawtucket, RI, hosted the 1st Footdown World Championships. Twenty-six contestants entered the event with George Costa taking home the overall win and cash purse to become the 2007 Footdown World Champion.

See also
 Cycle polo

References

Cycling